= Italian White =

Italian White may refer to:

- a cultivar of Helianthus annuus, the common sunflower
- common fig cultivar
